Anna Maria Sandri (born 10 August 1936), credited under the name Maria Sandri, is an Italian actress who portrayed the daughter of a Bedouin sheikh, Mabrouka ben Yussef, in The Black Tent.

Selected filmography 
 La morte civile (1942)
 Who is Without Sin (1952)
 Captain Phantom (1953)
 High School (1954)  
 The Red and the Black (1954)  
 Square Fortune (1955)
 The Black Tent (1956)

References

External links
 
 BFI.org

1936 births
Living people
Italian film actresses
Place of birth missing (living people)
20th-century Italian actresses